Robert Cholmondeley, 1st Earl of Leinster (26 June 1584 – 8 October 1659), was an English Royalist and supporter of Charles I during the English Civil War.

Life
Cholmondeley  was born in Crouchend, Highgate, Middlesex, on 26 June 1584, the son of Sir Hugh Cholmondeley and Mary Holford (daughter of Christopher Holford of Holford). He was created a Baronet on 29 June 1611.

He was High Sheriff of Cheshire in 1620 and served as MP for Cheshire in 1625. He was created Viscount Cholmondeley of Kells (Ireland) in 1628 and Baron Cholmondeley of Wich Malbank (i.e. Nantwich in Cheshire) on 1 September 1645. On 5 March 1646, he was created Earl of Leinster in Ireland.

He died 2 October 1659, and was buried in the chancel of Malpas church.

Family

He was married to Catherine Stanhope (daughter of John Stanhope, Lord of Harrington, and sister of Charles Stanhope, Lord Stanhope of Harrington). He died at Cholmondeley on 8 October 1659 and was buried at Malpas. He had no surviving legitimate issue so the family estates passed to his nephew, Robert Cholmondeley, son of his brother Hugh. His titles expired at his death.

References

Attribution

External links
 thornber.net
 nottshistory.org.uk

|-

1584 births
1659 deaths
Cavaliers
English MPs 1625
Earls in the Peerage of Ireland
People from Highgate
High Sheriffs of Cheshire
Robert
Peers of Ireland created by Charles I
Peers of England created by Charles I